Diggle is a village in the civil parish of the Saddleworth in Metropolitan Borough of Oldham, in Greater Manchester, England. The village is situated on the moorlands of the Pennine hills.

Historically part of the West Riding of Yorkshire, it is located at one end of the restored Standedge Canal Tunnel, Britain's longest, deepest and highest canal tunnel. In the village there is a listed building, the Gate pub and a post office/off-licence.

Diggle is home to Diggle F.C., an FA registered amateur football club which plays its home games at Churchill Playing Fields, Uppermill. It competes in the Huddersfield and District Association Football League.

History
The name "Diggle" comes from the Saxon word degle meaning "valley". Like many of the Saddleworth villages, it traces its history back to a collection of hamlets.

Transport
A railway line that connects Manchester to Huddersfield and Leeds runs through Diggle. There used to be a local railway station in the village, which opened in 1849, but it was one of many to go in the Beeching era, closing in 1963. The nearest stations to Diggle are in Greenfield and Marsden in Yorkshire.

Diggle is served by the 184 and 356 bus services. The 184 is run by First Greater Manchester between Oldham and Huddersfield hourly in both directions Monday to Saturdays with the 184 running every 2 hours on Sunday. Diggle is also served by the 356 which runs between Oldham and Ashton-under-Lyne via Denshaw, Uppermill, Greenfield, Mossley and Stalybridge with service up to every hour on Weekdays and Saturdays and every 2 hours on Sundays.

See also

Listed buildings in Saddleworth

References

Diggle
Towns and villages of the Peak District
Geography of the Metropolitan Borough of Oldham
Saddleworth